Neekaneet (Foremost Man) (c. 1874 - 1897) was a Plains Cree chief,  leader of the Nekaneet Cree Nation  who settled in Cypress Hills in 1880.   He was declared a National Historic Person on 13 November 1981.

Neekaneet died in Cypress Hills on 16 May 1897. His people were granted a reserve in 1913.

References

Persons of National Historic Significance (Canada)
1870s births
1897 deaths
Cree people